Bertha of Sulzbach (1110s – 1159) was a Byzantine empress by marriage to Byzantine Emperor Manuel I Komnenos.

Life
She was born in Sulzbach, a daughter of Berengar II, Count of Sulzbach (c. 1080 – 3 December 1125) and his second spouse Adelheid of Wolfratshausen. He was one of the rulers who signed the Concordat of Worms.

Empress

Emissaries of the Byzantine emperor John II Komnenos arrived in Germany, seeking an alliance against Roger II of Sicily. To seal the alliance, the emissaries requested that Conrad send a princess of his family to be married to the emperor's son, Manuel. Instead, Conrad selected his sister-in-law, Bertha, and after legally adopting her as his daughter, sent her to the Byzantine Empire escorted by Emicho von Leiningen, the Bishop of Würzburg.

By the time Bertha arrived at the Imperial court in Constantinople, the emperor John was dead, and his son Manuel was now the reigning emperor. Manuel delayed marrying her for three years, until shortly after Epiphany 1146, at which point she became empress and was renamed "Irene" (Εἰρήνη), a common name for foreign-born princesses. As an introduction for her to the Hellenic culture she was marrying into, John Tzetzes wrote his Allegories on the Iliad.

Bertha-Irene was noted for shunning the frivolity of the luxurious Byzantine court; Basil of Ochrid, the archbishop of Thessalonica, praised her for her modesty and piety, and Nicetas Choniates (53sq.) noted that she did not wear face-paint. The patriarch of Constantinople, Cosmas II Atticus, who had been accused of heresy, allegedly cursed Bertha-Ireneʻs womb in 1147 to prevent her bearing a son.

Bertha-Irene died in Constantinople in 1159. Her husband Manuel was described as "roaring like a lion" in grief at her death, despite his infidelities during her lifetime. He remarried, in 1161, to Maria of Antioch.

Issue
She and Manuel had two daughters:
 Maria Comnena (1152–1182), who married Renier of Montferrat
 Anna Comnena (1154–1158)

Notes

References

Sources

 Otto of Freising, Deeds of Frederick Barbarossa
 Choniates, Nicetas, Historia, ed. J.-L. Van Dieten, 2 vols., Berlin and New York, 1975; trans. as O City of Byzantium, Annals of Niketas Choniates, by H.J. Magoulias, Detroit; Wayne State University Press, 1984.
 Garland, Lynda. Byzantine Empresses, 1999
 Garland, Lynda, & Stone, Andrew, "Bertha-Irene, first wife of Manuel I Comnenus", De Imperatoribus Romanis (external link)

1110s births
1159 deaths
Komnenos dynasty
12th-century German women
German countesses
12th-century Byzantine empresses
12th-century German nobility
Converts to Eastern Orthodoxy from Roman Catholicism
Burials at the Monastery of Christ Pantocrator (Constantinople)
Manuel I Komnenos
People from Amberg-Sulzbach